The Shadow Cabinet of Todd Muller was the official Opposition of the 52nd New Zealand Parliament. It comprised the members of the New Zealand National Party, which was the largest party not a member of the Government.

The Shadow Cabinet was established on 22 May 2020, after Todd Muller was elected Leader of the National Party. Portfolio allocations were announced three days later. Two minor reshuffles were made during the Shadow Cabinet's duration, to reflect the decisions of two MPs not to seek re-election at the general election scheduled for September 2020.

The Muller Shadow Cabinet ceased to exist after Muller abruptly resigned the leadership on 14 July 2020 after only 53 days.

Formation 
Muller was voted in as Leader of the National Party in an emergency caucus meeting on 22 May 2020, replacing Simon Bridges. Former Education Minister and Auckland Central representative Nikki Kaye was voted as his deputy. At his first press conference, Muller confirmed that Paul Goldsmith would retain his position as National's Spokesperson for Finance. The following day, Muller announced that he would be taking on the Small Business portfolio.

The remaining portfolio allocations and caucus rankings were announced on 25 May. Notably, key supporters of Muller received promotions, including Transport Spokesperson Chris Bishop and first-term list MP Nicola Willis, who succeeded Judith Collins as Housing Spokesperson. Collins, a former Minister of Justice and two-time aspirant to the party leadership who did not contest the May 2020 vacancy, was appointed Shadow Attorney-General and Spokesperson for Economic Development. Selwyn MP Amy Adams, who, like Collins is also a former Justice Minister and 2018 leadership contender, rescinded her previously-announced decision to retire at the 2020 general election and was ranked third with the new position of Spokesperson for COVID-19 Recovery.

Former leader Simon Bridges was not allocated a portfolio, with the National Party press release noting that Bridges would be taking time "reflect on his future" and that Muller would offer him a Shadow Cabinet position if he decides to remain in politics. Bridges immediately issued a counter-statement that he was "not considering his future" and intended to remain in Parliament and seek re-election as MP for Tauranga. The New Zealand Herald reported that Bridges had been offered the Justice portfolio, but rejected this and instead asked to be Foreign Affairs spokesperson. These positions were filled by Mark Mitchell and Gerry Brownlee, respectively. It was also reported that Muller had intended not to assign portfolios or a rank to Bridges' former deputy Paula Bennett, who had unsuccessfully attempted to retain this position under the new leader. A year later, Bennett confirmed in an interview that Muller had told her he planned to rank her "really poorly," and "didn't see a role" for her. Ultimately, Bennett was placed thirteenth and lost her social investment portfolio to Louise Upston and role as the party's election campaign chair to Brownlee. She remained spokesperson for women and for drug reform but, in June, announced that she would retire from Parliament at the election. Anne Tolley, who had previously indicated her intention to be the party's nominee for Speaker but was demoted fifteen places in the Muller Shadow Cabinet, also announced her retirement.

The six National Members of Parliament that had previously indicated they will not contest the general election (David Carter, Nicky Wagner, Nathan Guy, Maggie Barry, Sarah Dowie and Alastair Scott) were not ranked or assigned a portfolio.

Criticism 
The Shadow Cabinet received some criticism immediately after its formation for its lack of Māori representation within its top ranking MPs. The highest ranking Māori MP is Paula Bennett at 13; Shane Reti (17) is the only other Māori in the top 20. At its dissolution, the Bridges Shadow Cabinet also had two Māori in the top 20, although these were the leader and deputy leader. Muller and Kaye attracted further criticism when they claimed that Pākehā MP Paul Goldsmith has Ngāti Porou descent; Goldsmith later confirmed that he does not.

Subsequent changes 
Todd Muller announced a shadow cabinet reshuffle on 2 July 2020, after the recent announcement of the retirement of Paula Bennett. The changes were minor. Shane Reti was promoted to rank 13, replacing Bennett, and taking on the additional portfolio of Associate Drug Reform. Former leader Simon Bridges was returned to the Shadow Cabinet in Reti's former position of 17, and took over from Gerry Brownlee the Foreign Affairs portfolio that he had previously requested. Bennett's former portfolios were assigned to Nikki Kaye (Women) and Amy Adams (Drug Reform). Like other retiring MPs, Bennett was assigned no portfolio or ranking. Anne Tolley was also assigned no ranking after announcing her retirement, but retained her parliamentary role as Deputy Speaker.

On 7 July 2020, Todd Muller removed the portfolios of Forestry, Land Information and Associate Tourism from Hamish Walker and transferred them to Ian McKelvie, initially as an interim measure while Walker was under investigation following his admission that he provided the personal details of COVID-19 patients to the media. On 8 July, Muller told the media that he was seeking to have Walker removed from the party, following which Walker announced that he would not seek re-election. He was therefore added to the group of unranked retiring MPs, while his portfolios remained with Ian McKelvie.

To the surprise of most commentators, Muller announced his resignation from the leadership on 14 July 2020 for health reasons, after 53 days in the leadership with only 67 days until the election on 19 September (later postponed to 17 October). In an emergency National Party caucus meeting over teleconference, Nikki Kaye was elected interim leader until an in-person meeting could be convened.

List of spokespersons  
At the point of its disestablishment, the Muller Shadow Cabinet consisted of the following spokespersons:

Unranked MPs 

 Hon Anne Tolley (Deputy Speaker)
 Rt Hon David Carter
 Hon Paula Bennett
 Hon Nicky Wagner
 Hon Nathan Guy
 Hon Maggie Barry
 Sarah Dowie
 Alastair Scott
 Hamish Walker

References 

New Zealand National Party
Muller, Todd
2020 establishments in New Zealand
2020 disestablishments in New Zealand